HD 130322 is an 8th-magnitude star in the constellation of Virgo. It is an orange dwarf, a type of star somewhat dimmer and cooler than the Sun. Spectral type of the star is K0V. It can only be seen with binoculars or telescope. Being almost exactly on the celestial equator the star is visible everywhere in the world except for the North Pole.

The star HD 130322 is named Mönch. The name was selected in the NameExoWorlds campaign by Switzerland, during the 100th anniversary of the IAU. Mönch is one of the prominent peaks of the Bernese Alps.

System
In 2000, an extrasolar planet was discovered orbiting the star.

The star rotates at an inclination of 76 degrees relative to Earth. It has been assumed that the planet shares that inclination. But several "hot Jupiters" are known to be oblique relative to the stellar axis.

See also
Lists of exoplanets

References

External links

K-type main-sequence stars
130322
072339
Virgo (constellation)
Planetary systems with one confirmed planet
Durchmusterung objects